The All-American Strongman Challenge is a leading competition in strength athletics that takes place within the annual Californian FitExpo. Although North America has a number of prestigious strongman events determining the "Strongest Man in America", the "Strongest Man in Canada" and the "Strongest Man in North America", the All-American Strongman Challenge has added kudos because it is open to entrants from overseas with the potential to bring in leading international competitors as well. It is notable for the calibre of entrants it has attracted, with many World's Strongest Man finalists being represented.

FitExpo 2005 
Dates: 19, 20 February 2005
Location: Pasadena (California) 

Contest Report:

FitExpo Strongman 2006 
Dates: 17, 18, 19 February 2006
Location: Pasadena (California) 

Report :

All-American Strongman Challenge 2007 
Dates: 20, 21, 22 February 2007
Location: Pasadena (California) 

Report :

All-American Strongman Challenge 2008 
Dates: 15, 16, 17 February 2008
Location: Pasadena (California) 

Report :

All-American Strongman Challenge 2009 
Dates: 24, 25 January 2009
Location: Los Angeles 

Report :

All-American Strongman Challenge 2010 
Dates: 23, 24 January 2010
Location: Los Angeles Convention Center, Los Angeles (California) 
Sponsor:Gaspari Nutrition
Report :
The All-American Strongman Challenge, once again at the bodybuilding.com/Los Angeles FitExpo, was in 2010 a truly international field. Organised by Odd Haugen, the event drew its largest crowd ever.  In addition to the title and prize money, the winner was guaranteed an invitation to the Arnold Strongman Classic contest, as well as one to the Mohegan Sun Grand Prix.

Results

All-American Strongman Challenge 2011 
Dates: 29, 30 January 2011
Location: Los Angeles Convention Center, Los Angeles (California) 
Sponsor:Gaspari Nutrition
The All-American Strongman Challenge was once again hosted by Odd Haugen at the bodybuilding.com/Los Angeles FitExpo. The event included a separate grip contest titled "Vice Grip Viking Challenge" which was won by Mark Felix along with $2,500 in prize money. The top 2 finishers of the strongman contest were guaranteed invitations to the Arnold Strongman Classic contest.

Results

Vice Grip Viking Challenge Results

All-American Strongman Challenge 2012
Dates: 28, 29 January 2012

Location: Los Angeles Convention Center, Los Angeles (California)

Sponsor:Met-Rx

The 2012 All-American Strongman Challenge was hosted by Odd Haugen at the Bodybuilding.com/Los Angeles FitExpo. The separate grip contest titled "Vice Grip Viking Challenge" returned for its second year, with Mark Felix retaining his title, along with $1,000 in prize money.

Results

Vice Grip Viking Challenge Results

See also 
 America's Strongest Man
 Arnold Strongman Classic
 North America's Strongest Man

References

External links 
 Official Portal 2010

Strongmen competitions
Sports in Los Angeles